Seydou Doumbia (born 31 December 1987) is an Ivorian former professional association footballer who played as a forward.

After beginning his career in the Ivory Coast and Japan, he arrived in Europe in 2008 to play for Swiss club Young Boys, where he was the top scorer and player of the year in the Swiss Super League in both of his seasons. In 2010, he signed for CSKA Moscow for a reported fee of €15 million, where he won six domestic honours and was twice the Russian Premier League's top scorer. He was transferred to Roma in 2015, and spent much of his tenure out on loan, including the 2016–17 season at Basel, where he won the league, Swiss Cup and was top scorer for a third time.

Doumbia made his international debut for the Ivory Coast in 2008. He was part of their squads at the 2010 FIFA World Cup and the Africa Cup of Nations in 2012 and 2015, winning the latter tournament.

Club career

Early career
Doumbia started his career at the Inter FC youth academy and started playing at second division partner club AS Athlétic Adjamé in 2003. He joined second division team Toumodi on loan for the 2004–05 season, and was on loan in 2005 at AS Denguélé, where he became Côte d'Ivoire Premier Division top scorer with 15 goals. In 2006, he moved to Japan, where he played for Kashiwa Reysol and then Tokushima Vortis. He left Asia on a free transfer and signed for BSC Young Boys in Europe in the summer of 2008, before failing a trial in Rapid Bucharest.

BSC Young Boys
In the Swiss Super League, he scored 20 goals in his maiden season and 30 in the 2009–10 season, making him twice top goalscorer in the Swiss Championship.

On 30 July 2009, Doumbia scored the only goal of the game as he slotted the ball past goalkeeper Gorka Iraizoz to defeat Athletic Bilbao 1–0 in the first leg of their Europa League qualifying round tie at the San Mamés.  Young Boys crashed out as they lost the second leg at home 2–1 on 6 August, thanks to goals from Fernando Llorente and Iker Muniain.  In the club's run in to their appearance in the 2009 Swiss Cup Final, Doumbia netted five goals, including a brace against FC Ibach and the only goal in their Round of 16 victory over FC Gossau.

Doumbia scored his first hat-trick for the club against Aarau on 4 October 2009, a 4–0 win, and netted another remarkable first-half hat-trick three weeks later in a 7–1 thrashing of Bellinzona on 29 October.  On 13 February 2010, Doumbia proved vital in his club's 2–1 win against Lucerne as he netted two times in the first 17 minutes of the game.  The Ivorian's final hat-trick in Swiss football came in a 4–0 thumping of Grasshopper on 20 March 2010.

CSKA Moscow

On 5 January 2010, Russian club CSKA Moscow completed the transfer of Doumbia on a five-year deal, for a reported fee of €15 million. Under the terms of the contract, he would stay at Young Boys until the end of the season, before moving to Russia.

He made his debut in a 2–1 win over Spartak Moscow on 1 August 2010, thereby becoming the 200th CSKA player to appear in the Russian league.

On 19 August 2010, he scored his first goal for CSKA Moscow in the first leg of a Europa League playoff tie against Anorthosis Famagusta and added another goal seven minutes later. In the second leg, Doumbia leveled the score with 5 minutes to go and CSKA Moscow went on to win 2–1 (6–1 in aggregate).  On 30 September, Doumbia scored goals either side of a Mark González penalty to earn his side a 3–0 victory over Sparta Prague to maintain the Russian's 100% record in Europa League Group F play.  In the next matchday, the Army Men travelled to the Stadio Renzo Barbera, where Doumbia netted another brace in a 3–0 win over Palermo on 21 October.

Doumbia's first goal of the new league campaign came on 17 April 2011, in their third Premier League fixture when he latched on to a Tomáš Necid cross and pushed it by Rubin goalkeeper Sergey Ryzhikov; the away win pushed the Army Men up into first place in the table.  In their Moscow derby against Dinamo on 8 May, Doumbia seemingly won the game with a strike in the 81st minute, until a defensive error let Marko Lomic equalize the game at 2–2 in the 90th minute.  In the final of the Russian Cup on 22 May 2011, Doumbia netted two times as CSKA defeated second-tier side Alania Vladikavkaz 2–1.

In CSKA's match against Tom Tomsk on 20 August 2011, Doumbia scored a second-half brace as the capital club eased to a 3–0 victory.  On 14 September, he scored twice in the Champions League against Ligue 1 champions Lille, helping his side secure a 2–2 draw after falling behind 2–0.  The Ivorian striker added two more goals as CSKA defeated Turkish side Trabzonspor 3–0 on 18 October, to record the Russians first victory in Group B play.  Five days later, Doumbia scored two goals to power CSKA to victory in their enthralling 5–3 game against side Anzhi Makhachkala.  In their following league game against Spartak Nalchik on 28 October, Doumbia scored a seven-minute hat-trick to earn his side a 4–0 win, after his teammate, Vagner Love, had put the hosts up 1–0 in the 34th minute. Doumbia opened the scoring against Internazionale on 7 December, guiding his side to a 2–1 away victory, which secured a berth in the Round of 16 against Spanish club Real Madrid.  On 29 December, Doumbia was voted the Russian Premier League Player of the Year after netting 24 goals in 30 league games during the calendar year as well as five Champions League goals in as many games.

On 19 March 2012, Doumbia scored a goal against city rivals Spartak, earning his side a 2–1 victory. He scored his final goal of the league season from the penalty spot, as CSKA defeated local rivals Lokomotiv 3–0 on 2 May.  Doumbia won the Golden Boot as he netted 23 goals in the initial league campaign, seven more than closest rival Alexandr Kerzhakov, and added five more goals in the Championship Group as well as providing 11 assists throughout the season.

Doumbia scored two first-half goals, the first of which was within two minutes of kick-off, as CSKA won 2–1 at Manchester City in the Champions League group stage on 5 November 2014.

Roma
On 31 January 2015, Doumbia joined Italian club Roma on a four-and-a-half-year deal for an initial fee of €14.4 million, rising to a potential €15.9 million. Doumbia scored twice in his thirteen appearances, in back-to-back games against Sassuolo and Genoa.

Loans to CSKA Moscow and Newcastle United
On 10 August 2015, Doumbia returned to CSKA Moscow on a season-long loan deal, following an unsuccessful spell with Roma.

On 1 February 2016, it was confirmed that Newcastle United had signed Doumbia on loan for the remainder of the 2015–16 season, with an option to make the deal permanent in the summer. The loan was unsuccessful, with Doumbia only making three appearances, all from the bench, and failing to score. Newcastle finished the season eighteenth and were relegated to the Championship.

Loan to Basel
On 28 June 2016, Basel announced that they had signed Doumbia on a one-year loan deal from A.S. Roma, with the option of a permanent deal at the end of the season. He joined Basel's first team for their 2016–17 season under head coach Urs Fischer. He made his domestic league debut on 24 July 2016, in a 3–0 home win at the St. Jakob-Park against Sion. He scored his first goal for his new club in the same game and just one week later on 31 July, during the away game against Vaduz, he scored his second. It was the last goal of the game and Basel won 5–1. Doumbia played in all six games that Basel had in the 2016–17 Champions League group stage scoring one goal. This was in the home in the St. Jakob-Park on 6 December 2016 in front of a sold out capacity groud of 36,000 spectators. But it could not help the team as they lost  4–1 against Arsenal. Under trainer Urs Fischer, Doumbia won the Swiss Super League championship at the end of the 2016–17 Super League season. This was the eighth title for the club in a row and their 20th championship title in total. They also won the Swiss Cup for the twelfth time, which meant they had won the double for the sixth time in the club's history.

Basel did not pull the option of a perminant transfer saying that the price was too high. During his time with the club Doumbia played a total of 41 games for Basel scoring a total of 21 goals. 25 of these games were in the Swiss Super League, three in the Swiss Cup six in the Champions League and seven were friendly games. He scored 20 goals in the domestic league and the other was scored in the Champions League.

Loan to Sporting
On 30 June 2017, Doumbia went on his fourth consecutive loan since joining AS Roma, this time to Sporting CP. He made his debut for the Lisbon club on 11 August, replacing Daniel Podence for the final 25 minutes of a 1–0 home win over Vitória F.C. in the first game of the season. Doumbia played rarely for Sporting, as manager Jorge Jesus considered him incapable of partnering the prolific Dutchman Bas Dost up front.

Doumbia scored his first goal for the club on 23 August, opening a 5–1 win away to FC Steaua București in the Champions League play-off second leg (also aggregate score). On 13 December, in the last 16 of the Taça de Portugal, he scored a hat-trick as the Lions won 4–0 against third-tier Vilaverdense F.C. at the Estádio José Alvalade.

Later career
On 28 August 2018, Doumbia signed with La Liga side Girona FC for three years. On 13 August of the following year, after suffering relegation, he terminated his contract.

Doumbia returned to Switzerland's top flight on 2 September 2019, on a one-year deal with FC Sion. He and eight teammates were sacked on 20 March 2020 for refusing a pay cut during the coronavirus pandemic.

On 27 January 2021, Doumbia joined Maltese Premier League side Ħamrun Spartans on a six-month contract.

International career
Doumbia earned his first international cap for Ivory Coast in a friendly against Japan during the Kirin Cup on 24 May 2008. He scored his first international goal in a friendly against Germany on 18 November 2009, in a 2–2 draw.

He was selected for Ivory Coast in the 2010 World Cup, but only made one appearance, as a 79th-minute substitute for Romaric, in the 3–0 win against North Korea.

Doumbia was selected for the Ivory Coast national team for the 2012 Africa Cup of Nations.

Doumbia announced his retirement from international competition after failing to make the Ivory Coast's squad for the 2014 FIFA World Cup, but was later called back by new coach Hervé Renard for the 2015 Africa Cup of Nations qualifiers and he returned to the national team.

At the 2015 Africa Cup of Nations finals, Doumbia scored les Éléphants first goal of the tournament during their opening 1–1 draw with Guinea. He became 2015 Africa Cup of Nations champion with the Ivory Coast national football team.

Personal life
Doumbia is the brother of the footballer Ousmane Doumbia.

Career statistics

Club

International
Source:

Scores and results list Ivory Coast's goal tally first.

HonoursCSKA Moscow Russian Premier League: 2012–13, 2013–14
 Russian Cup: 2010–11, 2012–13
 Russian Super Cup: 2013, 2014FC Basel Swiss Super League: 2016–17
 Swiss Cup: 2016–17Sporting CP Taça da Liga: 2017–18Ħamrun Spartans Maltese Premier League: 2020–21Ivory Coast Africa Cup of Nations: 2015; runner-up: 2012Individual'
 Côte d'Ivoire Premier Division Top scorer: 2005
 Swiss Footballer of the Year: 2009, 2010
 Swiss Super League Top scorer: 2008–09, 2009–10, 2016–2017
 Futbol Footballer of the Year in Russia: 2011, 2014
 Sport-Express Footballer of the Year in Russia: 2011
 Russian Premier League Top scorer: 2011–12, 2013–14

References

External links

 
 CSKA Moscow profile
  
 Football.ch profile

1987 births
Living people
People from Yamoussoukro
Ivorian footballers
Ivorian expatriate footballers
BSC Young Boys players
Kashiwa Reysol players
Tokushima Vortis players
J1 League players
J2 League players
Expatriate footballers in Japan
Ivory Coast international footballers
Swiss Super League players
Primeira Liga players
Toumodi FC players
AS Denguélé players
2010 FIFA World Cup players
2012 Africa Cup of Nations players
2015 Africa Cup of Nations players
Expatriate footballers in Switzerland
Expatriate footballers in Russia
Expatriate footballers in Italy
Expatriate footballers in England
Expatriate footballers in Portugal
Expatriate footballers in Spain
Expatriate footballers in Malta
Russian Premier League players
Premier League players
Serie A players
La Liga players
PFC CSKA Moscow players
A.S. Roma players
Newcastle United F.C. players
FC Basel players
Sporting CP footballers
Girona FC players
FC Sion players
Ħamrun Spartans F.C. players
Association football forwards
Africa Cup of Nations-winning players
Footballers from Abidjan
Ivorian expatriate sportspeople in Switzerland
Ivorian expatriate sportspeople in Russia
Ivorian expatriate sportspeople in Italy
Ivorian expatriate sportspeople in England
Ivorian expatriate sportspeople in Spain
Ivorian expatriate sportspeople in Malta
Ligue 1 (Ivory Coast) players
Maltese Premier League players